Rudbeckia laciniata, the cutleaf coneflower, is a species of flowering plant in the family Asteraceae. It is native to North America, where it is widespread in both Canada and the United States. Its natural habitat is wet sites in flood plains, along stream banks, and in moist forests. Common names other than cutleaf coneflower include cutleaf, goldenglow, green-headed coneflower, tall coneflower, sochan and thimbleweed.

The Latin specific epithet laciniata refers to the pinnately divided leaves.

Description

It has broadly ovate and somewhat glaucous leaves that are often deeply dissected. The alternate leaves are usually divided into a petiole and a leaf blade. The smooth or hairy leaf blade is simple or one to two-pinnate. The leaflets are lobed three to eleven times. The leaf margin is smooth to roughly serrated. Long rhizomes are formed as persistence organs with fibrous roots. The stem is bare.

Inflorescence
The composite flowers (flower heads) are produced in late summer and autumn. The disc flowers are green to yellowish green, while the rays are pale yellow. In umbrella-clustered total inflorescences, two to 25 cup-shaped partial inflorescences stand together. The inflorescence base is almost spherical to conical.

In a flower basket there are 8–12 ray flowers and 150 to over 300 tubular disk flowers. The stylus branches have a length of 1 to 1.5 mm.

The 3 to 4.5 mm long achenes have a crown-shaped or four up to 1.5 mm long scales consisting of pappus.

Similar species 
R. hirta is similar, with a hemispherical disk and orangish-yellow rays.

Taxonomy
Up to six varieties of R. laciniata are currently recognized. The varieties ampla and heterophylla are considered to be the most distinctive, while the others less so. There is variation in treatment among authors, with the less distinctive varieties sometimes being subsumed into laciniata, and variety ampla sometimes recognized at the species level.

The six varieties are:
Rudbeckia laciniata var. ampla – Native west of the Great Plains, into to the Rocky Mountains
Rudbeckia laciniata var. bipinnata – Native to New England and the Mid-Atlantic area
Rudbeckia laciniata var. digitata – Native to the Southeastern Coastal Plain
Rudbeckia laciniata var. heterophylla – Endemic to Levy County, Florida
Rudbeckia laciniata var. humilis – Native to the southern Appalachian Mountains
Rudbeckia laciniata var. laciniata – Widespread and common, native across eastern North America

Cultivation
Rudbeckia laciniata is widely cultivated in gardens and for cut flowers. Numerous cultivars have been developed, of which 'Herbstsonne' ("Autumn sun") and 'Starcadia Razzle Dazzle' have gained the Royal Horticultural Society's Award of Garden Merit. The cultivar 'Goldquelle' features double yellow, pom-pom blooms that are 8 cm across.

Rudbeckia laciniata has long been cultivated as an ornamental plant and came to Paris in the private garden of Vespasias Robin at the beginning of the 17th century. Caspar Bauhin also received this ornamental plant from Robin in 1622 , who described it as 'Doronicum americanum laciniato folio'. The first garden in Germany in which it is recorded is Altdorf 1646. The double-flowered form, which is mainly cultivated, has been known since around 1894. The first naturalizations on river banks in Central Europe were observed in the 18th century. Anton Johann Krocker reported about it in 1787 in Queistal near Flinsburg in eastern Upper Lusatia. As an ornamental plant, varieties are used in parks and gardens in temperate areas, for example also filled forms. In Europe, Rudbeckia laciniata became wild in various countries. Besides Europe, Rudbeckia laciniata is a neophyte in China and New Zealand. [6] 

The Lady Bird Johnson Wildflower Center notes that "Because it spreads rampantly by underground stems, cut-leaf coneflower is only appropriate for large sites."

Toxicity
The plant is somewhat toxic to livestock.

Uses
Traditionally, the young leaves have been gathered from the wild and eaten in the early spring. They are greatly favored as a potherb (cooked). Though some references state the use of this plant as salad greens (raw), traditional use is as cooked greens. This is assumed to be done to remove toxins. However, there is little evidence of their presence. One report cites circumstantial evidence of poisoning to horses, sheep and pigs.

Gallery

References

External links

https://theonefeather.com/2014/04/gettin-wild-sochan/
http://archive.alleghenyfront.org/story/seed-bank-saves-traditional-food-plants.html
http://www.newstribune.com/news/features/story/2016/mar/02/dining-wild-goldenglow-offers-fresh-spring-greens/537416/

laciniata
Flora of North America
Plants used in Native American cuisine
Plants described in 1753
Taxa named by Carl Linnaeus